Taylor Lorenz (born October 21  1984–1987) is an American journalist for The Washington Post. She was previously a technology reporter for The New York Times, The Daily Beast, and Business Insider, and social media editor for the Daily Mail. She is particularly known for covering Internet culture.

Early life and education 
Lorenz was born in New York City and grew up in Old Greenwich, Connecticut, attending nearby Greenwich High School. She attended college at the University of Colorado Boulder and later transferred to Hobart and William Smith College where she graduated with a degree in political science. Lorenz has stated that the social media site Tumblr caused her to become interested in internet culture.

Career
Lorenz worked as a social media editor for the Daily Mail from 2011 to 2014, becoming their head of social media. After a short stint writing for The Daily Dot in 2014, she was a technology reporter for Business Insider from 2014 to 2017. In 2017, she wrote briefly for The Hills blog section, and was assaulted by a counter-protester while covering the Unite the Right rally in Charlottesville, Virginia. From 2017 to 2018, she worked as a technology reporter for The Daily Beast. From 2019 to 2022, she was a technology reporter for The New York Times. In March 2022, Lorenz left the The New York Times and joined The Washington Post as a columnist.

In 2019, Lorenz was made a Visiting Fellow at Harvard University's Berkman Klein Center for Internet & Society by the Nieman Foundation for Journalism.

According to The Caret, her reporting is consumed frequently by "Silicon Valley venture capitalists, marketers and...anyone curious about how the internet is shaping the ways in which humans express themselves and communicate." According to TheWrap, "since her time at the Times, she's attracted an inordinate amount of online criticism, particularly from those in the right-wing media." Fortune stated that she has "cemented herself as a peerless authority" whose name became "synonymous with youth culture online" during her time with The Daily Beast and The Atlantic. Reason magazine credited her with popularizing the term "OK boomer" in a story declaring "the end of friendly generational relations."

In August 2021, Lorenz and The New York Times were sued by influencer talent agent and entrepreneur Ariadna Jacob for defamation in an August 2020 article about her company, Influences. In September 2022, a judge dismissed the lawsuit, saying that Jacob had failed to prove defamation.

In December 2022, Lorenz was temporarily suspended from Twitter following a series of suspensions of journalists under Elon Musk's ownership of Twitter. Lorenz was suspended after asking Musk for comment on a story. He later tweeted the suspension was for "prior doxxing action".

Accolades 
Lorenz was named to Fortune's 40 Under 40 listing for 2020 under the Media and Entertainment category. That same year, Adweek included her in their "2020 Young Influentials Who Are Shaping Media, Marketing and Tech" listing, stating of Lorenz that she "contextualizes the internet as we live it."

Coverage of Libs of TikTok 
On April 19, 2022, The Washington Post published an article by Lorenz about the right-wing Twitter account Libs of TikTok and publicized the identity of the account owner as Chaya Raichik, an Orthodox Jew who worked in real estate. These details were retrieved from early iterations of the Libs of TikTok Twitter account. The online version of the article initially included a link to Raichik's real estate license.

The article proved controversial, with Lorenz accused of doxxing, antisemitism for mentioning Raichik's religion, and hypocrisy for having previously spoken out against online harassment. Raichik herself accused Lorenz of doxxing and told the New York Post that she "will never be silenced". Raichik also accused Lorenz of violating her right to free speech. In a tweet, Lorenz said that her "whole family was doxed again this morning...trolls have now moved on to doxing and stalking any random friends I've tagged on Instagram." YouTuber Tim Pool and The Daily Wire CEO Jeremy Boreing purchased a billboard in Times Square to accuse Lorenz of doxxing. In response, Lorenz called the billboard "so idiotic it's hilarious".

Lorenz argued that Raichik's information was already publicly available.

Coverage of the Depp v. Heard trial 
In June 2022, Lorenz published an article on the coverage of the Depp v. Heard trial by YouTube personalities, which originally claimed that two of the YouTubers discussed in the article, LegalBytes and ThatUmbrellaGuy, were contacted for comment prior to publication. Both YouTubers later denied being contacted by Lorenz, prompting a series of editorial corrections to the article which eventually included an admission that stealth editing had violated the paper's policy. In a tweet, Lorenz blamed the errors on a miscommunication with her editor, leading some critics to accuse her of buck passing. The tweet was discussed and agreed on by Lorenz and multiple editors according to three people with knowledge of the discussions.  The New York Times subsequently reported that Lorenz had been moved from the features staff to the technology team, and that Cameron Barr, a senior managing editor at The Washington Post, had "been asked to review her articles before publication". Lorenz denied that she had moved teams, writing on Twitter, "I have absolutely not been demoted, not even remotely. My job has not changed at all." She further asserted that news coverage of the errors by CNN and others was in "bad faith", "irresponsible and dangerous", and designed to "amplify a manufactured outrage campaign by right wing media & radicalized influencers, which is driving a vicious harassment/smear campaign against me."

Personal life
In January 2015, Lorenz announced her engagement to Christopher Mims, a technology columnist at The Wall Street Journal. In a 2022 interview with Zagat, Lorenz identified herself as vegan. In an interview with MSNBC, Lorenz said that she has "severe PTSD" from experiencing online harassment.

Notes

References

External links
 
  on the Fediverse

1980s births
21st-century American journalists
Age controversies
American women journalists
Hobart and William Smith Colleges alumni
Journalists from Connecticut
Journalists from New York City
Living people
People from Old Greenwich, Connecticut
The New York Times people
The New York Times writers
The Washington Post journalists
Victims of cyberbullying
Year of birth missing (living people)